The voiced palatal lateral affricate is a type of consonantal sound, used in some spoken languages. There are two ways it can be represented: either by using the IPA as ⟨⟩, or by using the non-IPA sign for the voiced palatal lateral fricative as //.

Features

Features of the voiced alveolar lateral affricate:

Occurrence
This sound occurs in the Sandawe language of Tanzania.

References

Affricates
Lateral consonants
Pulmonic consonants
Voiced oral consonants
Palatal consonants